Besjana Reçica (born 13 April 1996) is a Kosovan footballer who plays as a midfielder for German club 1. FFC Recklinghausen and has appeared for the Kosovo national team.

Career
Reçica has been capped for the Kosovo national team, appearing for the team during the UEFA Women's Euro 2021 qualifying cycle.

See also
List of Kosovo women's international footballers

References

External links
 
 

1996 births
Living people
Kosovan women's footballers
Kosovo women's international footballers
Women's association football forwards